Myobatrachidae, commonly known as Australian ground frogs or Australian water frogs, is a family of frogs found in Australia and New Guinea. The entire family is either terrestrial or aquatic frogs, with no arboreal species.

Characteristics
The family Myobatrachidae contains forms of parental care unique in the animal kingdom. The two species of gastric-brooding frog (genus: Rheobatrachus), are found in this family. The females of these species swallow their young, where they develop until metamorphosis. The pouched frog (Assa darlingtoni) has pouches on the sides of its body. The male will guard the eggs until hatching, and assist the tadpoles into its side, where they stay until metamorphosis. Another form of parental care, although not unique, is found in many species of the genus Limnodynastes, where the male buries himself near an egg mass, and protects the eggs.

While many species are adapted to burrowing, helping them survive in semiarid or seasonally arid environments, the turtle frog and sandhill frog go so far as to lay their eggs directly into moist sand several feet below the surface, rather than into water. These species lack tadpoles, with the eggs hatching directly into miniature frogs.

These frogs lack adhesive toe discs found in the tree frogs. The family is broken into subfamilies based mainly upon their egg-laying habits. Those of the subfamily Limnodynastinae lay foam nests. The female creates foam by agitating a chemical on her skin with her hands. The foam may float on top of water, or be on land. The subfamily Rheobatrachinae contains the two species of gastric-brooding frogs, and the rest are within the subfamily Myobatrachinae.

Taxonomy
The following genera are recognised in the family Myobatrachidae. Some taxonomists split these genera into two subfamilies, Myobatrachinae and Rheobatrachinae, while other sources include Limnodynastinae as a subfamily of Myobatrachidae.

Notes

References

 

 
Myobatrachoidea
Amphibian families
Amphibians of Australia
Amphibians of New Guinea
Amphibians of Papua New Guinea
Oligocene amphibians
Extant Chattian first appearances
Taxa named by Hermann Schlegel
Australasian realm fauna